Mi Buenos Aires querido is a 1961 Argentine film directed by Francisco Mugica to a script by Rodolfo Manuel Taboada and original music by :es:Sebastián Piana and Francisco Canaro. It was premiered on 28 March 1961. The cast featuresh Mario Fortuna, María Luisa Robledo, Gilda Lousek and Enzo Viena.

References

External links

1961 films
Argentine musical comedy films
1960s Spanish-language films
1960s Argentine films